Yevgeny Sergeyevich Krug (born 20 April 1986) is a former Russian professional association football player.

Club career
He played 4 seasons in the Russian Football National League for FC Mordovia Saransk, FC Dynamo Barnaul and FC Yenisey Krasnoyarsk.

Personal life
His younger brother Eduard Krug is also a footballer.

External links
 
 
Player page by sportbox.ru

1986 births
Sportspeople from Novosibirsk
Living people
Russian footballers
Jewish footballers
Association football defenders
FC Spartak Moscow players
FC Mordovia Saransk players
FC Dynamo Barnaul players
FC Irtysh Omsk players
FC Yenisey Krasnoyarsk players
FC Novokuznetsk players
FC Volga Ulyanovsk players